Pilar Pérez Reyes (born February 20, 1986 in Culiacan, Sinaloa) is a Mexican TV host, journalist, model and former beauty pageant titleholder.

Career
Pilar was born in Culiacan, Sinaloa but she  moved to León, Guanajuato from an early age.
As a beauty pageant contestant she was crowned Miss Guanajuato in 2006. This gave her the right to participate in 
Nuestra Belleza México 2006.

She first started in television in 2010 by hosting several TV shows for Fox Deportes in Mexico. She hosted Central Fox from 2011 to 2016.

In 2016 she joined ESPN Deportes which made her move from Mexico City to Los Angeles.  She hosted Nación ESPN from 2016 to 2018 alongside David Faitelson and Mauricio Pedroza.

After Nacion ESPN got cancelled she hosted the Spanish version of SportsCenter. 
In 2019 she joined the cast of  Ahora o Nunca alongside Herculez Gomez. This made her move again this time from Los Angeles to Miami.

Pilar appears frequently on the Jorge Ramos y su banda  TV show and participates in other ESPN Deportes events.

In 2021 at the 42nd Sports Emmy Awards, Pilar won the Sports Emmy Award for Outstanding On-Air Personality in Spanish for her work with ESPN Deportes.

Personal life
Pilar is a fan of Club León from the Liga MX.  Pilar is the sister of Omar Pérez Reyes, a Mexican actor and television host better known by his stage name "Faisy".

References

1986 births
Living people
Mexican female models
Models from Guanajuato
Mexican beauty pageant winners
Mexican women journalists
Mexican sports journalists
Mexican television presenters
Mexican women television presenters
Mexican expatriates in the United States
People from León, Guanajuato